Henry Smith Pritchett (April 16, 1857 – August 28, 1939) was an American astronomer and educator.

Biography

Pritchett was born on April 16, 1857 in Fayette, Missouri, the son of Carr Waller Pritchett, Sr., and attended Pritchett College in Glasgow, Missouri, receiving an A.B. in 1875.

He then took instruction from Asaph Hall for two years at the US Naval Observatory after which he was made an assistant astronomer. In 1880, he returned to Glasgow to take a position at the Morrison Observatory, where his father Carr Waller Pritchett, Sr. was director. He served as an astronomer on the Transit of Venus Expedition to New Zealand in 1882. When he returned in 1883, he took an appointment as professor of mathematics and astronomy and director of the observatory at Washington University in St. Louis. In the early 1890s he studied in Germany, where he earned a PhD from the University of Munich in 1894. He was Superintendent of the US Coast and Geodetic Survey from 1897 to 1900.

Pritchett served as the president of the Massachusetts Institute of Technology (MIT) from 1900 to 1906.

Pritchett was elected a member of the American Antiquarian Society in 1902. Pritchett later resigned, though the reasons and timing are unclear.

He was president of the Carnegie Foundation for the Advancement of Teaching (CFAT) from 1906 until he retired in 1930. His principal accomplishment while with the CFAT was the institution of a fully funded pension program (the Teachers Insurance and Annuity Association, TIAA) in 1918.

He also served as the first president of the National Society for the Promotion of Industrial Education (1907). He had a long involvement with the Carnegie Endowment for International Peace, and served as a trustee for Carnegie Institute of Washington.

He died on August 28, 1939 in Santa Barbara, California.

Legacy
Pritchett Lounge, on the second floor of the Walker Memorial building at MIT, is named in his honor.

References

 Lagemann, Ellen Condliffe. Private Power for the Public Good: A History of the Carnegie Foundation for the Advancement of Teaching. Middletown, CT: Wesleyan University Press, 1983.

External links

NOAA biography
Medical Education in the United States and Canada, Pritchett authored the forward, 1910

1857 births
1939 deaths
American astronomers
Presidents of the Massachusetts Institute of Technology
Washington University in St. Louis faculty
Washington University physicists
Washington University in St. Louis mathematicians
United States Coast and Geodetic Survey personnel
People from Fayette, Missouri
Members of the American Antiquarian Society
Carnegie Endowment for International Peace